Andrey or Andrei Stepanov may refer to:
Andrei Ivanovich Stepanov (1930–2018), Soviet and Russian diplomat
Andrei Stepanov (footballer) (born 1979), Estonian footballer
Andrei Stepanov (ice hockey) (born 1986), Belarusian ice hockey player for Yunost Minsk
Andrei Stepanov (cyclist) (born 1999), Russian cyclist